Vageeswari cameras  were large format cameras made in India. These were once known as one of the best field cameras in the world.

History 
Vageeswari cameras were designed and manufactured by K. Karunakaran, an Alappuzha-based technician.

Karunakaran's father Kunju Kunju Bhagavathar, a part-time musician, earned his livelihood by designing and repairing music instruments such as Veena, harmonium, violin etc.  Karunakaran used to help his father in his workshop that helped him gain a practical idea of the concepts of physics.

Construction
The frame of Vageeswari cameras was made of teak with brass clips and screws. The lens was imported from Germany. 

The first camera came with a price tag of Rs 250. Eight variants were produced that included small cameras that were used to make a maximum of four passport-size photos .

See also 
 List of photographic equipment makers
 Field camera
 List of camera types

References

Cameras